USS Milwaukee (AOR-2) was a  commissioned  by the U.S. Navy in 1969. She continued to support Navy requirements until 1994 when she was placed in the reserve fleet and later struck.

History
Milwaukee was laid down on 29 November 1966 and launched on 1 January 1969 at the shipyard of the General Dynamics Corporation, Quincy, Massachusetts. On 1 November 1969 she was commissioned USS Milwaukee (AOR-2) and placed into service for the fleet.

Operational service
During the Vietnam War USS Milwaukee participated in operation Vietnam Ceasefire from 12 November 1972 through 20 February 1973. Milwaukee earned one campaign star for Vietnam War service.

In September 1976, returning from a routine deployment, Milwaukee along with  had the honor of transporting the world-famous King Tutankhamun Exhibition to the United States for the Metropolitan Museum of Art in New York City.

In September and October 1977 Milwaukee sailed on separate 3-week deployments to the Caribbean Sea in support of Atlantic Fleet exercises, with port calls at Roosevelt Roads, Puerto Rico and St. Thomas, U.S. Virgin Islands.

On 1 March 1980 the Malaysian oil tanker Santo Prestige lost power and collided with Milwaukee which was moored in Norfolk, Virginia. The collision results in a  gash in the hull of Milwaukee.

In 1985 Milwaukee participated in the anti-submarine exercise Arctic Sharem.

Decommissioning 
On 27 January 1994 Milwaukee was decommissioned and struck from the Naval Vessel Register on 8 April 1997. On 15 January 2009, Milwaukee was sold for $56,410 for scrapping to Bay Bridge Enterprises, Chesapeake, Virginia.

References

 

Wichita-class replenishment oilers
Cold War auxiliary ships of the United States
Ships built in Quincy, Massachusetts
1969 ships